The functionalism–intentionalism debate is a historiographical debate about the origins of the Holocaust as well as most aspects of the Third Reich, such as foreign policy. The debate on the origins of the Holocaust centres on essentially two questions:

Was there a master plan on the part of Adolf Hitler to launch the Holocaust? Intentionalists argue there was such a plan, while functionalists argue there was not.
Did the initiative for the Holocaust come from above with orders from Adolf Hitler or from below within the ranks of the German bureaucracy? Although neither side disputes the reality of the Holocaust, nor is there serious dispute over the premise that Hitler (as Führer) was personally responsible for encouraging the anti-Semitism that allowed the Holocaust to take place, intentionalists argue the initiative came from above, while functionalists contend it came from lower ranks within the bureaucracy.

The terms were coined in a 1981 essay by the British Marxist historian Timothy Mason. Notable functionalists have included Timothy Mason, Raul Hilberg, Karl Schleunes, Christopher Browning, Hans Mommsen, Martin Broszat, Götz Aly, Christian Gerlach, Zygmunt Bauman, Timothy Snyder and David Cesarani. Notable intentionalists have included William Shirer, Hugh Trevor-Roper, Alan Bullock, Karl Bracher, Andreas Hillgruber, Klaus Hildebrand, Eberhard Jäckel, Leni Yahil, Israel Gutman, Gerhard Weinberg, Walter Laqueur, Saul Friedländer, Richard Breitman, Lucy Dawidowicz and Daniel Goldhagen.

Origins of the debate
The search for the origins of the Holocaust began almost as soon as World War II ended. At the Nuremberg War Crimes Trials of 1945–46, the "Final Solution to the Jewish Question in Europe" was represented by the prosecution as part of the long-term plan on the part of the Nazi leadership going back to the foundations of the Nazi Party in 1919. Subsequently, most historians subscribed to what would be nowadays considered to be the extreme intentionalist interpretation. Books such as Karl Schleunes' The Twisted Road to Auschwitz which was published in 1970 influenced a number of historians to challenge the prevailing interpretation and suggested there was no master plan for the Holocaust. In the 1970s, advocates of the intentionalist school of thought were known as "the straight road to Auschwitz" camp or as the "programmists", because they insisted that Hitler was fulfilling a programme. Advocates of the functionalist school were known as "the twisted road to Auschwitz" camp or as the "structuralists", because of their insistence that it was the internal power structures of the Third Reich that led to the Holocaust.

In 1981, the British historian Timothy Mason published an essay entitled "Intention and Explanation" that was in part an attack on the scholarship of Karl Dietrich Bracher and Klaus Hildebrand, both of whom Mason accused of focusing too much on Adolf Hitler as an explanation of the Holocaust. In this essay, Mason called the followers of "the twisted road to Auschwitz"/structuralist school "functionalists" because of their belief that the Holocaust arose as part of the functioning of the Nazi state, while the followers of "the straight road to Auschwitz"/programmist school were called "intentionalists" because of their belief that it was Hitler's intentions alone that explained the Holocaust. The terms "intentionalist" and "functionalist" have largely replaced the previous terms used to signify the conflicting schools of thought.

Debate 
Those historians who take an intentionalist line, like Andreas Hillgruber, argue that everything that happened after Operation Barbarossa was part of a masterplan he credited Hitler with developing in the 1920s. Hillgruber wrote in his 1967 book Germany and the Two World Wars that for Hitler:

The German historian Helmut Krausnick argued that:

Alfred Streim wrote in response that Krausnick had been taken in by the line invented after the war to reduce the responsibility of the Einsatzgruppen leaders brought to trial. Klaus Hildebrand wrote that:

Against the intentionalist interpretation, functionalist historians like Martin Broszat argued that the lower officials of the Nazi state had started exterminating people on their own initiative. Broszat argued that the Holocaust began "bit by bit" as German officials stumbled into genocide. Broszat argued that in the autumn of 1941 German officials had begun "improvised" killing schemes as the "simplest" solution to the "Jewish Question". In Broszat's opinion, Hitler subsequently approved of the measures initiated by the lower officials and allowed the expansion of the Holocaust from Eastern Europe to all of Europe. In this way, Broszat argued that the Shoah was not begun in response to an order, written or unwritten, from Hitler but was rather “a way out of the blind alley into which the Nazis had manoeuvred themselves”. The American historian Christopher Browning has argued that:

By contrast, the Swiss historian Philippe Burrin argues that such a decision was not made before August 1941 at the earliest, pointing to orders given by Himmler on 30 July 1941 to the 2nd SS Cavalry Regiment and the SS Cavalry Brigade operating in the Pripet Marshes in the Pripyat operation calling for the murder of male Jews only while the Jewish women and children were to be driven into the Marshes. Browning argues that sometime in mid-July 1941 Hitler made the decision to begin general genocide owing to his exhilaration over his victories over the Red Army, whereas Burrin contends that the decision was made in late August 1941 owing to Hitler's frustration over the slowing down of the Wehrmacht. Kershaw argues that the dramatic expansion in both the range of victims and the intensity of the killings after mid-August 1941 indicates that Hitler issued an order to that effect, most probably a verbal order conveyed to the Einsatzgruppen commanders through either Himmler or Heydrich. It remains unclear whether that was a decision made on Hitler's own initiative motivated only by his own anti-Semitic prejudices, or (impressed with the willingness and ability of Einsatzgruppe A to murder Jewish women and children) ordered that the other three Einsatzgruppen emulate Einsatzgruppe A's bloody example.

The Canadian historian Erich Haberer has contended that the "Baltic flashpoint of genocide", as the killings committed by Einsatzgruppe A between July–October 1941 are known to historians, were the key development in the evolution of Nazi anti-Semitic policy that resulted in the Holocaust. The Baltic area witnessed both the most extensive and intense killings of all the Einsatzgruppen with 90,000–100,000 Jews killed between July and October 1941, which led to the almost total destruction of the Jewish communities in that area. Haberer maintains that the "Baltic flashpoint of genocide" occurred at time when the other Nazi plans for a "territorial final solution" such as the Madagascar Plan were unlikely to occur, and thus suggested to the Nazi leadership that genocide was indeed "feasible" as a "final solution to the Jewish Question".

Functionalism

Extreme
Extreme functionalists such as Martin Broszat believe that the Nazi leadership had nothing to do with initiating the Holocaust and that the entire initiative came from the lower ranks of the German bureaucracy. This philosophy is what is known as the bottom-up approach of the Holocaust. Götz Aly has made much of documents from the bureaucracy of the German Government-General of Poland arguing that the population of Poland would have to decrease by 25% to allow the Polish economy to grow. Criticism centers on the idea that this explanation does not really show why the Nazis would deport Jews from France and the Netherlands to death camps in Poland if it was Poland the Nazis were concerned with, and why the Jews of Poland were targeted instead of the random sample of 25% of the Polish population.  Additional criticism of functionalism points out that Hitler and other Nazi leaders delayed railcars providing supplies to front line troops in the Soviet Union so that Jews could be deported by rail from the USSR to death camps thus demonstrating the pursuit of genocidal policies over pragmatic wartime actions.
Hans Mommsen was a leading expert on Nazi Germany and the Holocaust. He argued that Hitler was a "weak dictator" who rather than acting decisively, reacted to various social pressures. Mommsen believed that Nazi Germany was not a totalitarian state. Together with his friend Broszat, Mommsen developed a structuralist interpretation of the Third Reich, that saw the Nazi state as a chaotic collection of rival bureaucracies engaged in endless power struggles and the Final Solution as a result of the "cumulative radicalization" of the German state as opposed to a long-term plan on the part of Adolf Hitler.

Moderate
Moderate functionalists, such as Karl Schleunes and Christopher Browning, believe that the rivalry within the unstable Nazi power structure provided the major driving force behind the Holocaust. Moderate functionalists believe that the Nazis aimed to expel all of the Jews from Europe, but only after the failure of these schemes did they resort to genocide. This is sometimes referred to as the "twisted road" to genocide, after a book by Schleunes called The Twisted Road to Auschwitz.

Intentionalism

Extreme
Lucy Dawidowicz argued that Hitler already decided upon the Holocaust no later than 1919. To support her interpretation, Dawidowicz pointed to numerous extreme anti-Semitic statements made by Hitler. Criticism has centered on the fact that none of these statements refer to killing the entire Jewish people; indeed, very few refer to killing Jews at all. Only once in Mein Kampf does Hitler ever refer to killing Jews, when he states "If at the beginning of the war and during the war twelve or fifteen thousand of these Hebrew corrupters of the people had been held under poison gas, as happened to hundreds of thousands of our very best German workers in the field, the sacrifice of millions at the front would not have been in vain."  Dawidowicz's critics contend, given that Mein Kampf is 694 pages long, she makes too much of one sentence. Daniel Goldhagen went further, suggesting that popular opinion in Germany was already sympathetic to a policy of Jewish extermination before the Nazi party came to power. He asserts in his book Hitler's Willing Executioners that Germany enthusiastically welcomed the persecution of Jews by the Nazi regime in the period 1933–39.

Wolfgang Benz points out that Adolf Hitler had already called for anti-Semitism in a 1919 publication "Gutachten zum Antisemitismus" and declared: "Its ultimate goal, however, must unalterably be the removal of the Jews altogether." That this "removal" meant for him the extermination of the Jews is shown by Hitler in a speech on 6 April 1920: "We do not want to be sentimental anti-Semites who want to create a pogrom mood, but we are animated by the implacable determination to seize the evil at its root and to exterminate it root and branch. In order to achieve our goal, any means must be acceptable to us, even if we have to join forces with the devil." On 3 July 1920 Hitler wrote to Konstantin Hierl: "As much as I cannot reproach a tubercle bacilli for an activity which means destruction for man but life for them, I am also compelled and entitled, for the sake of my personal existence, to wage the fight against tuberculosis by destroying its pathogens. The Jew, however, becomes and has become through thousands of years in his work the racial tuberculosis of the peoples. To fight him is to destroy him."

According to the journalist Josef Hell, Hitler is said to have replied to the question of what he would do against the Jews if he had full freedom of action:  In 1924, Hitler further unfolded the racist rationale for it in Mein Kampf, also picking up on the views of Karl Eugen Dühring: Without clear recognition of the racial problem, and thus of the Jewish question, a resurgence of the German nation will no longer take place.'

Moderate
Moderate intentionalists such as Richard Breitman and Saul Friedlander believe that Hitler decided upon the Holocaust sometime after coming to power in the 1930s and no later than 1939 or 1941. This school makes much of Hitler's "Prophecy Speech" of January 30, 1939 before the Reichstag where Hitler stated "If the international Jewish financiers in and outside Europe should succeed in plunging the nations once again into a world war, then the result will not be the victory of Jewry, but the annihilation of the Jewish race in Europe!" The major problem with this thesis, as Yehuda Bauer points out, is that though this statement clearly commits Hitler to genocide, he made no effort after delivering this speech to have it carried out. Furthermore, Ian Kershaw has pointed out that there are several diary entries by Joseph Goebbels in late 1941, in which Goebbels writes that "The Führer's prophecy is coming true in a most terrible way." The general impression one gets is that Goebbels is quite surprised that Hitler was serious about carrying out the threat in the "Prophecy Speech".

Synthesis
A number of scholars such as Arno J. Mayer, Yehuda Bauer, Peter Longerich, Ian Kershaw, Michael Burleigh and Michael Marrus have developed a synthesis of the functionalist and intentionalist schools. They have suggested the Holocaust was a result of pressures that came from both above and below and that Hitler lacked a master plan, but was the decisive force behind the Holocaust. The phrase 'cumulative radicalisation' is used in this context to sum up the way extreme rhetoric and competition among different Nazi agencies produced increasingly extreme policies, as fanatical bureaucratic underlings put into practice what they believed Hitler would have approved based on his widely disseminated speeches and propaganda. This phenomenon is referred to more generally in social psychology as groupshift.

Given the fact that scholars have written so much in relation to Nazi Germany, Richard Bessel asserts that "The result is a much better informed, much more detailed and more nuanced picture of the Nazi regime, and most serious historians of the Nazi regime now are to some extent both 'intentionalists' and 'functionalists'—insofar as those terms still can be used at all."

See also
Holocaust denial
Bottom-up approach of the Holocaust
Nazi foreign policy debate
Auschwitz bombing debate
Historiography of GermanyHistorikerstreitSonderwegVergangenheitsbewältigungVictim theory, a theory that Austria was a victim of Nazism following the AnschlussReferences

Sources

Aly, Götz & Susanne Heim. Architects of annihilation: Auschwitz and the logic of destruction. Princeton, NJ: Princeton University Press, 2002.
Bauer, Yehuda. Rethinking the Holocaust. New Haven Conn.; London: Yale University Press, 2001.
 Bessel, Richard. "Functionalists vs. Intentionalists: The Debate Twenty Years on or Whatever Happened to Functionalism and Intentionalism?" German Studies Review Vol. 26, no. 1 (2003): pp. 15–20. 
Bracher, Karl Dietrich The German Dictatorship; The Origins, Structure, and Effects of National Socialism. translated from the German by Jean Steinberg; With an Introduction by Peter Gay, New York, Praeger 1970.
Breitman, Richard. The architect of genocide: Himmler and the Final Solution. New York: Knopf: Distributed by Random House, 1991.
Broszat, Martin. German National Socialism, 1919–1945 translated from the German by Kurt Rosenbaum and Inge Pauli Boehm, Santa Barbara, Calif., Clio Press, 1966.
Broszat, Martin. The Hitler State: The Foundation and Development of the Internal Structure of the Third Reich London: Longman, 1981.
 
Browning, Christopher R. Fateful months: essays on the emergence of the final solution, 1941–42. New York: Holmes & Meier, 1985.

Browning, Christopher R. The path to genocide: essays on launching the final solution. Cambridge: Cambridge University Press, 1992.
Browning, Christopher R. Nazi policy, Jewish workers, German killers. Cambridge ; New York: Cambridge University Press, 2000.
Browning, Christopher R. The origins of the Final Solution: the evolution of Nazi Jewish policy, September 1939 – March 1942 Lincoln: University of Nebraska Press, 2004.
Burrin, Philippe Hitler and the Jews: the genesis of the Holocaust London ; New York: Edward Arnold ; New York, NY: Distributed in the US by Routledge, Chapman, and Hall, 1994.
Dawidowicz, Lucy S. The war against the Jews, 1933–1945 New York: Holt, Rinehart and Winston, 1975.
Fleming, Gerald Hitler and the Final Solution Berkeley: University of California Press, 1984.
 
Hilberg, Raul The Destruction of the European Jews Yale University Press, 2003, c1961.
Hildebrand, Klaus Das Dritte Reich  Muenchen: Oldenbourg, 1980 translated into English by P.S. Falla as The Third Reich, London: G. Allen & Unwin, 1984.
 
 Kershaw, Sir Ian Hitler, 1889–1936: Hubris, New York: Norton, 1999, 1998.
Kershaw, Sir Ian The Nazi dictatorship: problems and perspectives of interpretation London: Arnold ; New York: Copublished in the US by Oxford University Press, 2000.
Kershaw, Sir Ian Hitler, 1936–45: Nemesis, New York: W.W. Norton, 2000.
 
Jäckel, Eberhard Hitler in history Hanover, NH: Published for Brandeis University Press by University Press of New England, 1984.
 
Mommsen, Hans. From Weimar to Auschwitz Princeton, N.J.: Princeton University Press, 1991.
 
Roseman, Mark. The Wannsee Conference and the Final Solution:A Reconsideration. New York: Metropolitan Books, 2002.
Rosenbaum, Ron Explaining Hitler: the search for the origins of his evil, New York: Random House, 1998
Schleunes, Karl. The Twisted Road to Auschwitz; Nazi Policy Toward German Jews, 1933–1939'', Urbana: University of Illinois Press, 1970.
 

Historiography of Nazi Germany
Holocaust historiography
Structuralism
Case studies
Political debates
Historical controversies